Lake Coeur d'Alene, officially Coeur d'Alene Lake, is a natural dam-controlled lake in North Idaho, located in the Pacific Northwest region of the United States. At its northern end is the city of Coeur d'Alene.

The lake was named after the Coeur d'Alene people.

Geology and geography

Lake Coeur d'Alene, like other lakes surrounding the Spokane Valley and Rathdrum Prairie, was formed by the Missoula Floods, most recently 12,000 to 15,000 years ago.  The Purcell Lobe of the Cordilleran Ice Sheet flowed south from Canada, carving the basin of present-day Lake Pend Oreille and damming the Clark Fork river. The impounded river repeatedly filled to form Glacial Lake Missoula and broke through the ice dam, resulting in massive floods that filled the Rathdrum Prairie area with sand, gravel, and boulders. Large eddy bars formed downstream from bedrock obstructions, thereby damming tributary valleys and creating lakes. Lake Coeur d'Alene is fed primarily by two rivers, the Coeur d'Alene and the Saint Joe. The outflow is via the Spokane River.

History

The first-recorded European to see the area was explorer David Thompson in 1807.

Flooding as a result of the construction and operation of the Post Falls Dam drastically changed the shape and size of the lake, expanding it to combine several smaller lakes into one.

The lake has been used for transporting lumber by water in Kootenai County since the timber industry started in the region. Prior to a fire in 1917, Harrison was planned as the county seat of Kootenai County, as the swiftly growing lumber town was at an opportune junction of the St. Joe and Coeur d' Alene rivers.  After the fire, the mills were moved mostly to the city of Coeur d'Alene, which developed more and was designated as the county seat.

A number of Ford Model T automobiles sitting on the bottom of the lake are the result of people in the early 1900s choosing to drive in winter across the frozen lake. But they did not always judge how thick the ice was, and went through. Also, steamboats on the bottom resulted from being burned and sunk as wrecks when they were no longer of use to ferry people around the lake. Since the late 20th century, divers frequently visit these ruins on the bottom as part of their recreation. Captain Sorensen of the Amelia Wheaton, operating the Wheaton, named most of the bays and features of Lake Coeur d’Alene.

The Coeur d'Alene Tribe owns the southern third of Lake Coeur d'Alene and its submerged lands as part of its reservation, in addition to miles of the Saint Joe River and its submerged lands, all of which the United States holds in trust for the tribe. Its rights to the lake and river were established in the first executive order founding its reservation, which originally included all of the lake.  In United States v. Idaho (2001), the United States Supreme Court held that an 1873 executive order issued by President Ulysses S. Grant formalized ownership by the tribe.

While the court holding has not affected usage and access to Lake Coeur d'Alene, the Environmental Protection Agency has ruled that the tribe may set its own water-quality standards on its portion of Lake Coeur d'Alene.

On July 5, 2020, a mid air collision between two small planes occurred over the lake. Eight people were killed in the accident.

Pollution

Environmental concerns have come as a result of upstream hard rock mining and smelting operations in the Silver Valley. The majority of the lake bed is covered in a layer of contaminated sediment and local health officials at the Panhandle Health District advise the lake's visitors to wash anything that has come into contact with potentially lead-laced soil or dust in the Coeur d'Alene River basin.

Recreation

Lake Coeur d'Alene is a popular tourist site for many people during the summer, offering great beaches and scenic views. A seasonal hobby of some local residents is viewing the bald eagles as they feed on the kokanee in the lake, mainly from the Wolf Lodge Bay. The fish that inhabit the lake include, bluegill, yellow perch, white crappie, largemouth bass, smallmouth bass, kokanee, Chinook salmon, northern pike. The North Idaho Centennial Trail, popular among cyclists, walkers, and joggers, follows along the lake's north and northeastern shore. The Trail of the Coeur d'Alenes also runs along the southern shores.

For a decade, the lake hosted unlimited hydroplane races for the Diamond Cup (1958–1966, 1968).

Idaho State Parks and public facilities
 Mineral Ridge National Recreation Trail
 Coeur d'Alene Parkway State Park 
 Heyburn State Park 
 Trail of the Coeur d'Alenes

See also

 Bunker Hill Mine and Smelting Complex
 Idaho v. Coeur d'Alene Tribe of Idaho (1997)
 Idaho v. United States (2001)
 Lake Pend Oreille
 Liberty Lake
 Mineral Ridge National Recreation Trail, Idaho

References

External links

Guide to Lake Coeur d'Alene
State of Idaho Parks and Recreation website
Parks and Waterways Facilities Map
Current Lake Coeur d'Alene water temperature, elevation, and weather conditions.

Buildings and structures in Benewah County, Idaho
Buildings and structures in Kootenai County, Idaho
Coeur d'Alene
Coeur d'Alene
Coeur d'Alene
Coeur d'Alene
Idaho Panhandle National Forest
Coeur d'Alene, Idaho